Jack Barlow (May 18, 1924 – July 29, 2011) was an American country music singer and songwriter. He recorded on Dot Records during the 1960s and 1970s, charting seven times on Hot Country Songs.

Barlow first worked as a disc jockey before moving to Nashville, Tennessee. His first single was "I Love Country", which reached number 21 on Cash Box in 1965. Barlow later moved to Epic Records, then to Dot Records, charting on Billboard for the first time in 1968 with "Baby, Ain't That Love". His highest chart entry came in late 1971 to early 1972, when he took "Catch the Wind" to number 26. This was followed by a recording of "They Call the Wind Maria", from the 1969 Clint Eastwood film Paint Your Wagon. Then in the mid 1970s Jack recorded a series of radio and TV commercials for Big Red chewing gum by Wrigley’s.

Barlow's last charting release was "The Man on Page 602", credited to Zoot Fenster. The song is about an image found in a 1975 Sears catalog, of a man modeling boxer shorts who appears to be inadvertently exposing his genitalia. Barlow continued to record until 2007, also singing commercial jingles and doing voice-over work. He died in mid-2011 from an undisclosed illness.

Discography

Albums

Singles

References

1924 births
2011 deaths
American country singer-songwriters
American male singer-songwriters
Dot Records artists
People from Moline, Illinois
Singer-songwriters from Illinois
Country musicians from Illinois